La Crosse Technology is a multinational manufacturer of electronic products including weather stations, radio-controlled clocks, and watches. The company was started in 1985 in La Crescent, Minnesota and is now located in La Crosse, Wisconsin La Crosse Technology's products are available in retail stores in North America.

History
La Crosse Technology introduced the radio-controlled clock, commonly (but incorrectly) called an "atomic clock" after the extremely accurate timepiece behind the radio signal it uses as a reference, into the United States commercial market in 1991.

In 2008, the company introduced the first Internet powered home weather station.

References

Manufacturing companies based in Wisconsin